The Reverend Archie Emerson Mitchell (born May 1, 1918) was a minister with the Christian and Missionary Alliance (C&MA). He was born in Franklin, Nebraska. He attended Simpson Bible College and Nyack Missionary College. Mitchell served as a missionary to South Vietnam working on the staff of the Ban Me Thuot Leprosarium when he was taken captive by the Vietcong on May 30, 1962, along with Daniel Amstutz Gerber and Dr. Eleanor Ardel Vietti. None of the three have been seen since.

Early life 
Mitchell was born in 1918 in Nebraska to Glen Mitchell and his wife Daisy née Chaplin. The family moved to Ellensburg, Washington in 1939. He attended Simpson Bible College in Seattle, where he met his future wife Elsie Winters. They were married in her home town of Port Angeles in 1943, and in 1945, he began his missionary work and they moved to Oregon.

Balloon bomb deaths 

On Saturday, May 5, 1945, Mitchell, who at that time was the pastor of the C&MA church (now called "Standing Stone Church of the Christian and Missionary Alliance") in Bly, Oregon, led a Sunday School picnic up into the nearby mountains of southern Oregon. Accompanying Mitchell was his five-months-pregnant wife, Elsie (née Winters), and five children from the church. Up in the mountains, Mitchell drove the car around by the road, while the others hiked through the woods. While Mitchell was getting the lunch out of the car near Leonard Creek, the others called to him and said that they had found what looked to be a balloon. Unbeknownst to the group, this was a dangerous Japanese incendiary Fu-Go balloon bomb. As Mitchell was warning them not to touch it, there was a large explosion. Mitchell ran to the spot and found the whole group dead.

Killed in the explosion were Elsie Mitchell, 26, and the five children: Sherman Shoemaker, 11, Jay Gifford, 13, Edward Engen, 13, Joan Patzke, 13, and Dick Patzke, 14. They were the first and only American civilians to be killed by enemy action in the continental United States during World War II.

In 1950, the Weyerhaeuser timber company built a monument at the site of the explosion. The Mitchell Monument is constructed of native stone and displays a bronze plaque with the names and ages of the victims of the balloon bomb explosion. Weyerhaeuser donated the monument along with the surrounding land to the Fremont National Forest in 1998. The monument site is listed on the National Register of Historic Places.

Indo-China mission 
On December 23, 1947, Mitchell with his new bride Betty (née Patzke, the older sister of two of the children killed by the fire balloon in Bly) sailed to Indo-China for what was the beginning of two five-year terms of service as missionaries to the Vietnamese people of Da Lat. After a two-year furlough, the Mitchells' third term of service would be their assignment at the Ban Me Thuot Leprosarium.

On Wednesday evening, May 30, 1962, Mitchell and the rest of the staff of the leprosarium were preparing to meet at Dr. Vietti's house for their weekly prayer meeting. At dusk, around 7:45 p.m., a group of 12 members of the Viet Cong entered the leprosarium grounds, which was located about nine miles from Ban Me Thuot. The Viet Cong split up into three groups of four members each, and one group met Dan Gerber, who served with the Mennonite Central Committee, and tied him up. A second group went to the Mitchell home, ordered Archie out of the house, tied him up, and led him away with Dan Gerber. This was witnessed by the members of the Mitchell family including his wife, Betty, and three of their four children, Rebecca (age 13), Loretta (age 10), and Glenn (age 8). The youngest Mitchell child, daughter Geraldine (age 4), was already asleep in bed. Another group of Viet Cong went to Vietti's house and found her in bed. She was ordered to get up, dress, and she was led out of the compound, unbound, to join the other two captives. The Viet Cong planned to take Betty and the children captive as well, but were convinced by the missionaries that they would only fully cooperate if Betty and the children were left behind. The Viet Cong also ransacked the buildings for any supplies they could use, including linens, medicines, clothing, and surgical equipment. At around 10:00 p.m. that evening the Viet Cong left the compound taking the prisoners (Mitchell, Gerber, and Vietti) and supplies with them. This all happened without any shots fired or any bloodshed.

After their capture both American and South Vietnamese military intelligence agencies immediately discovered where the captives were probably being detained, and also confirmed that the Viet Cong used the missionaries' medical expertise to treat their own sick and wounded. While military intelligence was able to successfully track the movements of Mitchell, Gerber, and Vietti, the heavy and continuous Viet Cong presence in and around the area they were being held captive did not allow the military to mount a rescue mission. Missionary officials also attempted to negotiate for release of the captives. Although, by 1969, negotiations between the C&MA and some Viet Cong soldiers appeared close to securing their release, the negotiations collapsed and never could be reconstituted.

See also
 List of people who disappeared

References

External links
 The Two Tragedies of Archie Mitchell, from the Forest History Society.

1918 births
1960s missing person cases
1962 in Vietnam
American evangelicals
American people of the Vietnam War
American Protestant missionaries
Members of the Christian and Missionary Alliance
Missing people
Missing person cases in Vietnam
People from Ellensburg, Washington
People from Franklin County, Nebraska
Protestant missionaries in Vietnam
Vietnam War prisoners of war